In crystallography, a lattice plane of a given Bravais lattice is any plane containing at least three noncollinear Bravais lattice points. Equivalently, a lattice plane is a plane whose intersections with the lattice (or any crystalline structure of that lattice) are periodic (i.e. are described by 2d Bravais lattices). A family of lattice planes is a collection of equally spaced parallel lattice planes that, taken together, intersect all lattice points. Every family of lattice planes can be described by a set of integer Miller indices that have no common divisors (i.e. are relative prime). Conversely, every set of Miller indices without common divisors defines a family of lattice planes. If, on the other hand, the Miller indices are not relative prime, the family of planes defined by them is not a family of lattice planes, because not every plane of the family then intersects lattice points.

Conversely, planes that are not lattice planes have aperiodic intersections with the lattice called quasicrystals; this is known as a "cut-and-project" construction of a quasicrystal (and is typically also generalized to higher dimensions).

References

Crystallography
Geometry